Vadim Donatovich Filimonov (14 January 1931 – 12 September 2022) was a Russian legal scholar and politician. A member of the Communist Party of the Russian Federation, he served in the State Duma from 1993 to 1999.

Filimonov died in Moscow on 12 September 2022, at the age of 91.

References

1931 births
2022 deaths
20th-century Russian politicians
First convocation members of the State Duma (Russian Federation)
Second convocation members of the State Duma (Russian Federation)
Communist Party of the Soviet Union members
Communist Party of the Russian Federation members
Tomsk State University alumni
Academic staff of Tomsk State University
Russian legal scholars
Politicians from Novosibirsk
Lawyers from Novosibirsk